Drasteria edwardsii is a moth of the family Erebidae. It is found from Washington, through Oregon to California.

The wingspan is 34–37 mm.

References

External links

"Erebid Moth Drasteria edwardsii". Natural History of Orange County, California.

Drasteria
Moths described in 1870
Moths of North America